Pegasso (born February 25, 1978) is a Mexican Luchador enmascarado (or masked professional wrestler) working for the Mexican professional wrestling promotion Consejo Mundial de Lucha Libre (CMLL). Pegasso worked from Asistencia Asesoría y Administración (AAA) from 2000 until 2008, where he was a part of the wrestling stable Real Fuerza Aérea. Pegasso's real name is not a matter of public record, as is often the case with masked wrestlers in Mexico where their private lives are kept a secret from the wrestling fans. The name Pegasso is Spanish for Pegasus, a winged horse from the Greek mythology. He has also wrestled as "Hombre sin Nombre" ("man without name") and "Pegasso Xtreme".

Professional wrestling career
The wrestler who would later be best known as Pegasso made his professional wrestling debut on April 30, 1999, after training under Sombra Salvaje, Irasu and Califa. Initially he wrestled under the name Hombre sin Nombre (Spanish for "the man with no name"), a concept often used by Luchadors who have yet to establish a ring persona.

Asistencia Asesoría y Administración
In 2000 he began working for Asistencia Asesoría y Administración (AAA), one of Mexico's largest promotions, and was given a new ring persona named Pegasso, after the mythological horse. Initially Pegasso worked low card matches while training with AAA's head trainer Gran Apache. Pegasso wrestled on his first major show not long after signing on with AAA as he teamed with Oscar Sevilla, Path Finder and Ludxor to defeat Gran Apache, Angel Mortal, Marabunta and Mr. Condor on the undercard of the 2000 Verano de Escandalo pay-per-view event. Over the following years Pegasso made very few wrestling appearances while working with Gran Apache and other AAA trainees to improve his skills. It was not until 2006 that Pegasso began making regular appearances for AAA as he became part of a group of young high fliers called Real Fuerza Aérea in 2006. Together with Super Fly, Pegasso qualified for the finals of a tournament to crown the inaugural AAA World Tag Team Champions at the 2007 Rey de Reyes show. The match was a four corners elimination match that also included Guapos VIP (Alan Stone and Zumbido), The Mexican Powers (Crazy Boy and Joe Líder) and winners The Black Family (Dark Cuervo and Dark Ozz). Pegasso participated in the 2007 Alas de Oro but was eliminated fourth, by his own teammate Super Fly. Following the Alas de Oro Pegasso made fewer and fewer high-profile appearances for AAA, at best working the undercard of the 2008 Reina de Reinas tournament as Real Fuerza Aérea (Pegasso, Aero Star, Gato Eveready and El Ángel) lost to Los Piratas (Pirata Morgan, Pirata Morgan, Jr. El Hijo de Pirata Morgan and Barba Roja). By late 2008 Pegasso and fellow Real Fuerza Aérea member Rey Cometa left AAA. Initially the two worked for International Wrestling Revolution Group (IWRG) as Real Fuerza Aérea but soon after began working for Consejo Mundial de Lucha Libre (CMLL), Mexico's largest and oldest wrestling promotion.

Consejo Mundial de Lucha Libre
Pegasso and Rey Cometa initially used the Real Fuerza Aérea name in CMLL as well, but quickly abandoned it when AAA objected to the use of the name. When signing with CMLL Pegasso received further training by CMLL head trainers Satánico and Franco Columbo. Pegasso and Rey Cometa formed a regular team in CMLL, often working the lower end of the card. On April 7, 2009, Pegasso was one of 10 men competing for the vacant CMLL World Super Lightweight Championship but he was eliminated halfway through the match with the title going to Mascara Dorada instead. On October 18, 2009, Pegasso was one of 12 wrestlers who put his mask on the line in a 12-man Luchas de Apuestas cage match. He was the fourth person to escape the cage keeping his mask safe. Pegasso teamed with Rey Cometa and Rouge to defeat Los Guerreros Tuareg (Hooligan, Skándalo and Loco Max) in the opening match of CMLL's year end show, Sin Salida, with Pegasso scoring the deciding fall. In May, 2015 Pegasso competed in a qualifying match for the 2015 version of En Busca de un Ídolo as one of 16 wrestlers in the qualifying torneo cibernetico, elimination match where the last eight wrestlers would qualify for the tournament. He competed against Akuma, Blue Panther Jr., Cancerbero, Canelo Casas, Delta, Disturbio, Esfinge, Flyer, El Gallo, Guerrero Maya Jr., Joker, Raziel, Sagrado, Stigma and Boby Zavala. Pegasso pinned Joker during the match but ended up as the fifth man eliminated when he was pinned by Stigma. On December 25, 2015, as part of CMLL's annual Infierno en el Ring show Pegasso was one of twelve men risking their mask in the main event steel cage match. He was the third man to leave the cage, keeping his mask safe in the process.

Multiple Pegassos
Pegasso is not the only Luchador to have used the name Pegasso. Two other luchadors have used a similar name in their: Pegaso who now works as Ciclón Ramírez and Pegaso (II) who is a former CMLL employee of little note.

References

1978 births
Living people
Masked wrestlers
Mexican male professional wrestlers
People from Puebla (city)
Professional wrestlers from Puebla
Unidentified wrestlers